Grao may refer to:

Places in Spain 
 Grao, Asturias, or Grado, a municipality in the Asturias
 , a subdistrict of the city of Valencia
 , a subdistrict of Gandia, Valencian Community
 , a district in Castellón de la Plana, Valencian Community
 , or Grao, the ancient port of Sagunto, Valencian Community

People with the name 
 Grão Vasco, Portuguese Renaissance painter
 Daniel Grao, Spanish actor

See also 
 Grão-Pará (disambiguation)
 Grau (disambiguation)
 Graw (disambiguation)